A penumbral lunar eclipse took place on 23 March 2016, the first of three lunar eclipses in 2016. The Moon was just 2.1 days before apogee, making it very small, so this was a "Micromoon" penumbral lunar eclipse.

Visibility 
It was visible from east Asia, Australia, and most of North America.

Related eclipses

Eclipses of 2016 
 A total solar eclipse on 9 March.
 A penumbral lunar eclipse on 23 March.
 A penumbral lunar eclipse on 18 August.
 An annular solar eclipse on 1 September.
 A penumbral lunar eclipse on 16 September.

This eclipse is the one of four lunar eclipses in a short-lived series at the ascending node of the moon's orbit.

The lunar year series repeats after 12 lunations or 354 days (Shifting back about 10 days in sequential years). Because of the date shift, the Earth's shadow will be about 11 degrees west in sequential events.

Half-Saros cycle
A lunar eclipse will be preceded and followed by solar eclipses by 9 years and 5.5 days (a half saros). This lunar eclipse is related to two partial solar eclipses of Solar Saros 149.

See also 
 August 2016 lunar eclipse, the second 2016 lunar eclipse (penumbral)
 September 2016 lunar eclipse, the third 2016 lunar eclipse (penumbral)
 List of lunar eclipses and List of 21st-century lunar eclipses

References

External links
 
 Hermit eclipse: 23 Mar 2016 - Penumbral Lunar Eclipse
 

2016-03
2016 in science
March 2016 events